WJLV (94.7 FM) is a radio station  broadcasting a Contemporary Christian music format from K-LOVE. Licensed to Jackson, Mississippi, the station is currently owned by the Educational Media Foundation (EMF).

History
WJLV was previously a Top 40/CHR format as "94-TYX" beginning in September 1978 and ending in March 1990. The station then flipped to a classic hits station known as "Arrow 94.7", both with the call letters WTYX. Around 2002, the station would be purchased by Jacksonville-based Backyard Broadcasting. On Friday, September 3, 2004 (at 3pm CDT), under the direction of program director Russ Schell, Arrow became adult hits "94-7 Jack FM", the first U.S. Jack FM station east of the Mississippi River under the WWJK call sign. Schell left WWJK in 2005. He was replaced by Don Wayne. Angela Roland managed the traffic.

In July, 2008, after six years (2002–2008) in the Jackson radio market, Backyard Broadcasting sold WWJK to Meridian-based New South Radio, but the deal was called off shortly thereafter.

On January 17, 2012, after approximately seven years as Jack FM, WWJK changed formats to Contemporary Christian "K-LOVE" after being sold to EMF. The last song played on Jack FM was Goodbye by Night Ranger. Jack FM was the 4th rated station in the Jackson area before the format swap. On February 17, 2012 WWJK changed to its current call sign, WJLV. The station replaced WJXN-FM (owned by Flinn Broadcasting) as the local K-LOVE affiliate.

External links
klove.com

JLV
K-Love radio stations
JLV
Educational Media Foundation radio stations